Ernest Dyson Falck (21 October 1907 – 19 February 1982) played first-class cricket for Somerset in 1935 and 1936. He was born in Huddersfield, West Yorkshire and died at Bridport, Dorset.

Falck was a right-handed middle-order batsman. He made his Somerset debut in the first first-class match to be played at Wells and stood alone while Reg Perks of Worcestershire devastated Somerset's first innings: Falck made 28 of the 56 that Somerset totalled, and Perks took seven for 21. Falck made his runs out of 39 added while he was at the wicket before becoming Perks' last victim. In the second innings he made 20 and was one of only four batsmen to reach double figures. He retained his place in the Somerset side for the next two games, but his success was in inverse proportion to his team's: both matches were won by Somerset, but Falck made only 14 runs in them. He returned for a single match in 1936 without success.

References

1907 births
1982 deaths
English cricketers
Somerset cricketers
Cricketers from Huddersfield
English cricketers of 1919 to 1945